C32 may refer to:

Vehicles

Aircraft
 Boeing C-32, an American military transport aircraft variant of the Boeing 757
 Caspar C 32, a German agricultural biplane
 Castel C-32, a French glider
 Douglas C-32, an American military transport aircraft

Automobiles
 Mercedes Benz C32 AMG, a German sedan
 Nissan Laurel C32, a Japanese sedan
 Sauber C32, a Swiss Formula One car

Locomotives
 GER Class C32, a British steam locomotive class
 New South Wales C32 class locomotive, an Australian steam locomotive

Ships
 , a C-class submarine of the Royal Navy

Other uses 
 C-32 highway (Spain), in Catalonia
 C32 road (Namibia)
 Bill C-32, various legislation of the Parliament of Canada
 Caldwell 32, a spiral galaxy
 Caterpillar C32, a diesel engine
 King's Gambit Declined, a chess opening
 Laryngeal cancer
 Socket C32, a server processor socket for AMD CPUs